Vladimir Viktorovich Petrov (born 27 April 1932) is a Russian rowing coxswain who competed for the Soviet Union in the 1956 Summer Olympics.

He was born in Moscow in 1932. In 1956 he coxed the Soviet boat that won the bronze medal in the coxed pair event. He was also the cox of the Soviet boat that was eliminated in the semi-finals of the eight competition.

References 

1932 births
Living people
Russian male rowers
Soviet male rowers
Coxswains (rowing)
Olympic rowers of the Soviet Union
Rowers at the 1956 Summer Olympics
Olympic bronze medalists for the Soviet Union
Olympic medalists in rowing
Medalists at the 1956 Summer Olympics
European Rowing Championships medalists